Retrato de familia (Family portrait) is a Mexican telenovela produced by Lucy Orozco for Televisa in 1995.

The series stars Helena Rojo, Alfredo Adame, Diana Bracho, Yolanda Andrade, Raúl Araiza and Saby Kamalich.

Plot 
In the city of Guadalajara lives Pilar Olivares and her two daughters, Cecilia and Irene. Cecilia is married to Agustín Preciado, with whom she has three children: Elvira, Octavio and Cristina. Despite the bad relationship between Cecilia and Agustín, she always tries to ensure the welfare of their children. However, Elvira has always despised her mother and idolized his father and her aunt Irene.

Cast 
 
Helena Rojo as Cecilia Mariscal Olivares de Preciado
Alfredo Adame as Esteban Acuña Andere
Diana Bracho as Irene Mariscal Olivares
Yolanda Andrade as Elvira Preciado Mariscal
Raúl Araiza as Diego Corona Ruffo
Saby Kamalich as Pilar Olivares de Mariscal
Alicia Montoya as Candelaria
Alejandro Tommasi as Nicolás Negrete
Irán Castillo as Cristina Preciado Mariscal
Aitor Iturrioz as Octavio Preciado Mariscal
Claudio Brook as Gabino Acuña
Regina Torné as Miriam Andere de Acuña
Nicky Mondellini as Patricia Cortés
Julián Pastor as Agustín Preciado
Ana María Aguirre as Nora Ruffo de Corona
Rodolfo Arias as Julián Bárcenas
Mariana Ávila as Mónica Bárcenas
Julio Bracho as Raúl
Fabiola Campomanes as Malena
Álvaro Carcaño as Antonio Mercader
Andrés García Jr. as Joaquín Acuña
Verónica Langer as Mercedes de la Canal
Martha Navarro as Rosario de Bárcenas
Teo Tapia as Honorio Bárcenas
Mercedes Pascual as Leonarda "Narda" Negrete
Alejandro Rábago as Álvaro Balcázar
Abraham Ramos as Jaime
Héctor Sáez as Sebastián Corona
Mariana Seoane as Araceli
Fernando Torres Lapham as Dr. Montealbán
Yoalli Bello as Petra
Gabriela Murray as Nurse María Ruán
Dobrina Cristeva as Laurita
Claudette Maillé as Ruth Vásquez
Paulina de Labra as Selene
Felipe Nájera as Dr. Ricardo Suárez
Humberto Yáñez as Larios
Dulce María as Elvira (child)
Eleazar Gómez as Octavio (child)
Ana Cristina Oceguera as Cristina (child)
Carmen Madrid
Jesús Ochoa
Julio Monterde
Mercedes Gironella
Astrid Hadad
Raquel Garza
Rafael Mercadante

Awards

References

External links

1995 telenovelas
Mexican telenovelas
1995 Mexican television series debuts
1996 Mexican television series endings
Spanish-language telenovelas
Television shows set in Guadalajara
Televisa telenovelas